Bishaash (Belief) is a Bangladeshi supernatural television series produced by BBC World Service Trust which was first broadcast on Bangladesh Television from 16 October 2010 until 18 March 2011.

The series stars Shama Rahman, Sayed Babu, Arabi Rahman and Rahmat Ali. It is about a British Bangladeshi woman named Zara who relocates to Bangladesh after she inherits a stake in a mysterious supernatural detective agency in Dhaka.

Plot summary
Zara Rahman (Shama Rahman), a young, head-strong, inquisitive woman discovers she has inherited co-ownership of an antique shop in Dhaka after the death of her grandfather. She moves to Bangladesh. She finds out the shop also houses a supernatural detective agency. She meets young supernatural investigator Abir Zaman (Babu Md. Shaidul Islam Molla) and is thrown into his world of supernatural mystery, magic and adventure.

Overview
Bishaash is south Asia's first supernatural detective series. and the first serial drama shot between Bangladesh and London, England. There are 24 paired episodes, each lasting 25 minutes.

The series features dialogue in Bengali and English. Initially, the dialogue in the series is in Bangla with English subtitles. However, episode by episode, more and more English dialogue is introduced.

The series was part of Mott MacDonald's £50 million nine-year programme since 2007 aimed at teaching many of the poorest people in Bangladesh what project director John Shotton describes as "vocational English". One of their project partners is broadcaster BBC World Service. The series was made by the BBC World Service Trust.

The programme was an initiative of English in Action, funded by the Department for International Development. by 2017.

The storylines have a supernatural twist which includes themes of family tradition, love, evil, and danger.

Production
Writers, directors and producers were recruited from the UK. Production staff includes staff from the UK as well as Bangladesh. Location manager Charlie Thompson recruited a local team from the domestic industry with basic industry experience or basic skill sets in the right areas and trained them to meet the required standards, broaden their skill bases and enable them to use them in the international arena. Half a dozen locals went through a formal training programme organised by Thompson that included seminars and on-the-job learning.

Bishaash is set in Dhaka, Bangladesh and Brick Lane, London. It was filmed in a variety of locations in and around Dhaka and a village was built in the forest region of Gazipur. It was shot on XDCAM and was edited in Bangladesh using Final Cut Pro.

Cast and characters

Main
 Rahmat Ali as Ferdous Zaman: Antique shop co-owner, and Abir and Laboni's uncle.
 Shama Rahman as Zara Rahman: Head-strong, inquisitive woman who relocates to Bangladesh when she inherits a stake in a detective agency.
 Babu Md. Shaidul Islam Molla (Sayed Babu) as Abir Zaman: Supernatural investigator and Zara's love interest.
 Arabi Rahman as Laboni Zaman: Technology and research expert, and Abir's cousin.

Recurring
 Jayanta Chattopadhyay as Dhormoraj: the chief of a tribe.
 Ahmed Rubel as Abdul Ali: Abir's maternal cousin who is after the Keystone Journal and intent on getting revenge on the Zamans.
 Fazlur Rahman Babu as 
 Humayun Faridi as Kabir Zaman: Antique shop co-owner, Abir's father, Ferdous' elder brother.
 Shatabdi Wadud as Sherzad / Alien / Announcer / Drug Dealer
 Mirana Zaman as Dadi (Grandmother): The matriarch of the Zaman family.

Guest
 Raisul Islam Asad as Nuruddin
 Shimul Yousuf as Rokeya
 A.T.M. Shamsuzzaman as Rustom
 Utsha Zaman as Baroon
 Reetu Abdus Sattar as Srabonti

Episodes

Series overview

Broadcast

Bishaash was broadcast weekly on Bangladesh Television and Bangladesh Television World from 16 October 2010. It was followed back-to-back with an episode of BBC Janala Mojay Mojay Shekha. and reached audiences of 20.3 million.

The series was provided without charge to Zee TV and was aired weekly from 6 March 2011 on Zee Network's Zee Café. The popularity of the series led to a rebroadcast.

See also
 British Bangladeshi

References

External links

2010 Bangladeshi television series debuts
2011 Bangladeshi television series endings
2010s Bangladeshi television series
Bangladeshi drama television series
Bangladeshi supernatural television shows
Detective television series
Mystery television series
Serial drama television series
BBC Television shows
English-language television shows
Bengali-language television programming in Bangladesh
Television shows set in London
Television shows set in Dhaka
British Bangladeshi mass media
Bangladesh Television original programming